Curwensville Lake is a reservoir located just to the south of the town of Curwensville, Pennsylvania.  The lake was formed due to the construction of the Curwensville Dam to the north of the lake.  Before the dam was built, there were several floods occurring along the West Branch Susquehanna River, affecting the towns of Curwensville, and Clearfield to the north.  On September 3, 1954 a Flood Control Act was passed due to the flooding along the West Branch river basin.  The dam cost $20,400,000 to construct.

References

External links

Reservoirs in Pennsylvania
Protected areas of Clearfield County, Pennsylvania
Bodies of water of Clearfield County, Pennsylvania